Violencia Musical ("Musical Violence") is the debut album by Hector & Tito, released in 1998.

Track list

References

1998 debut albums
Héctor & Tito albums